Tri-Cities Airport  (also known as Tri-Cities Airport, TN/VA), is in Blountville, Tennessee, United States. It serves the Tri-Cities area (Bristol, Kingsport, Johnson City) of Northeast Tennessee and Southwest Virginia. The airport is governed by the Tri-Cities Airport Authority (TCAA) whose members are appointed by the cities of Johnson City, Kingsport, Bristol (TN), Bristol (VA) and both Washington County (TN) and Sullivan County (TN).

Federal Aviation Administration records say the airport had 202,730 passenger boardings (enplanements) in calendar year 2008, 217,783 in 2009 and 202,114 in 2010. The National Plan of Integrated Airport Systems for 2017–2021 categorized it as a primary commercial service airport (more than 10,000 enplanements per year).

History
In the mid-1930s Johnson City's airfield and Kingsport's airstrip were deemed not practical for expansion. Bristol, Johnson City, and Kingsport cooperated with Sullivan County to build an airport on 323 acres in Sullivan County, between the three cities. In September 1937, two small runways, a terminal building, and aircraft hangar had been built and the airport saw its first airliner, an American Airlines DC-2. On November 5, 1937, McKellar Field, now known as Tri-Cities Airport TN/VA, was dedicated by Senator Kenneth McKellar.

American Airlines pulled out in 1952. Piedmont Airlines flew to TRI from 1948 until it merged into USAir; Capital Airlines and successor United Airlines stopped at TRI from the 1940s until 1977 when Allegheny Airlines replaced them. Southern Airways appeared in 1960. The first jets were Piedmont Boeing 727-100s and Southern Douglas DC-9-10s in 1967; in 1977 a Piedmont Boeing 737-200 was flying nonstop to New York LaGuardia Airport.

In January 2008 a quick service restaurant, Tailwind Express, was added in the post-security area of the airport along with the Tailwind Restaurant and Lounge in the pre-security area. In April 2012 the airport broke ground on a $10 million project that would lengthen a taxiway and move a road farther away from the airport, opening 140 acres for future development.

Facilities
Tri-Cities Airport covers 1,250 acres (506 ha) at an elevation of 1,519 feet (463 m). It has two asphalt runways: 5/23 is 8,000 by 150 feet (2,438 x 46 m) and 9/27 is 4,442 by 150 feet (1,354 x 46 m).

For the year ending March 31, 2014 the airport had 46,484 aircraft operations, an average of 127 per day: 72% general aviation, 25% air taxi, 2% airline and 1% military. In March 2017, there were 60 aircraft based at this airport: 20 single-engine, 22 multi-engine, 13 jet and 5 helicopter.

Airlines and destinations

Statistics

Top destinations

Accidents and incidents
On April 1, 1993, NASCAR driver Alan Kulwicki and three others were killed when a Fairchild Merlin crashed on approach to the airport. The cause of the Alan Kulwicki plane crash was pilot error in operating the aircraft's engine anti-ice system.

References

External links
 Tri-Cities Regional Airport, official website
 Tri-Cities Reg. TN/VA - TRI at Tennessee DOT Airport Directory
 Northeast Tennessee Tourism Association
 Aerial image as of March 1997 from USGS The National Map
 
 
 

Airports in Tennessee
Buildings and structures in Sullivan County, Tennessee
Transportation in Sullivan County, Tennessee
Blountville, Tennessee
Airports established in 1937
1937 establishments in Tennessee